Scott Levene (born August 31, 1995) is a retired American professional soccer player who played as a goalkeeper for Memphis 901 and New York Red Bulls II in the USL Championship. Before turning professional, he played for the University of Connecticut.

Career

College & Youth
Levene played four years of college soccer at the University of Connecticut between 2014 and 2017. He red-shirted in 2013.
During his time, he started in 70 consecutive games keeping 31 clean sheets.

While in college, Levene also appeared for Premier Development League side K-W United FC in 2017.

Professional
On March 22, 2018, Levene signed for United Soccer League side New York Red Bulls II.

References

External links 
 

1995 births
Living people
American soccer players
Association football goalkeepers
UConn Huskies men's soccer players
K-W United FC players
New York Red Bulls II players
Soccer players from Connecticut
Sportspeople from Stamford, Connecticut
USL Championship players
USL League Two players
Memphis 901 FC players